The 2018 2. deild karla was the 53rd season of third-tier football in Iceland. Twelve teams contested the league. Play began on 5 May and conclude on 22 September.

Teams
The league will be contested by twelve clubs, eight of which played in the division during the 2017 season. There are four new clubs from the previous campaign:
Leiknir F. and Grótta were relegated from the 2017 1. deild karla, replacing Njarðvík and Magni who were promoted to the 2018 1. deild karla
Kári and Þróttur V. were promoted from the 2017 3. deild karla, in place of KV and Sindri who were relegated to the 2018 3. deild karla

Club information

League table

Results
Each team plays every opponent once home and away for a total of 22 matches per club, and 132 matches altogether.

Top goalscorers

References

External links

2. deild karla seasons
Iceland
Iceland
3